The Ambassador Extraordinary and Plenipotentiary of the Russian Federation to Republic of Poland is the official representative of the President and the Government of the Russian Federation to the President and the Government of Poland.

The ambassador and his staff work at large in the Embassy of Russia in Warsaw. There are consulates general in Gdańsk, Krakow, and Poznań.

History of diplomatic relations

Poland and Russia have exchanged diplomatic missions for centuries. The first ambassador in the modern meaning of this word, from Poland to Russia, was Antoni Augustyn Deboli, in the late 18th century. After the period of partitions of Poland, in 1918, relations were established between the Second Polish Republic and Soviet Union. After Soviet invasion of Poland in 1939 those relations were broken, to be briefly reestablished in 1941 after the German invasion of the Soviet Union, when the Soviet Union and Polish government in exile agreed to cooperate against their common enemy, Nazi Germany. Those relations were broken in 1943 after discovery of the Katyn massacre. In 1989 the communist government of the Polish People's Republic was replaced with a democratic form that continues to the present; after the dissolution of the Soviet Union in 1991, Poland recognised the Russian Federation.

List of representatives (1508 – present)

Representatives of the Tsardom of Russia to the Kingdom of Poland (1508)

Representatives of the Tsardom of Russia to the Polish-Lithuanian Commonwealth (1584–1721)

Representatives of the Russian Empire to the Polish-Lithuanian Commonwealth (1721–1795)

Representatives of the Soviet Union to the Republic of Poland (1921–1943)

Representatives of the Soviet Union to the Polish People's Republic (1945–1989)

Representatives of the Soviet Union to the Republic of Poland (1989–1991)

Representatives of the Russian Federation to the Republic of Poland (1991–present)

See also
List of ambassadors of Poland to Russia

References

 
Poland
Russia